Ifet-Džamal Taljević (born 12 June 1980) is a German retired professional footballer who played as a midfielder.

Career
Born in Novi Pazar, Taljević started his career at Tennis Borussia Berlin, where he played once during the 1999–2000 2. Bundesliga season. He spent several years playing in the Regionalliga with Tennis Borussia Berlin, Chemnitzer FC and FC St. Pauli, and two seasons at Oberliga with Hansa Rostock reserves.

Taljević then moved to Swiss Challenge League with FC Wil and then AC Bellinzona where he took the number 10 from Adrian Piț who left for A.S. Roma.

External links
 
 

1980 births
Living people
Yugoslav emigrants to Germany
Naturalized citizens of Germany
Sportspeople from Novi Pazar
Bosniaks of Serbia
German footballers
Association football midfielders
2. Bundesliga players
Swiss Super League players
Tennis Borussia Berlin players
FC Hansa Rostock players
Chemnitzer FC players
FC St. Pauli players
FC Wil players
AC Bellinzona players
Neuchâtel Xamax FCS players
FC Thun players
German expatriate footballers
German expatriate sportspeople in Switzerland
Expatriate footballers in Switzerland